The Sun City Rays were a short-lived professional baseball team, based in Sun City, Arizona. The Rays was a member of the Senior Professional Baseball Association in 1990 for the league's second season.

Jim Marshall managed the team, while Dave Hilton and Fred Stanley served as coaches. The Rays ceased operation when the circuit folded in December of that year. At the time the league folded, they had a 13–10 record and were second in the standings.

Notable players

 Gary Allenson
 Barry Bonnell
 Ernie Camacho
 Bill Campbell
 Ron Davis
 Jim Dwyer
 Juan Eichelberger
 Pete Falcone
 Rollie Fingers
 Bob Galasso
 Dave Hilton
 Ferguson Jenkins
 Pete LaCock
 Rick Lancellotti
 Jack Lazorko
 Ricky Peters
 Lenny Randle
 Ronn Reynolds
 Tony Scott
 Razor Shines
 Guy Sularz
 Roy Thomas
 Joel Youngblood
 Mark Wagner

Sources

Senior Professional Baseball Association teams
1990 establishments in Arizona
Baseball teams established in 1990
Defunct baseball teams in Arizona
Baseball teams disestablished in 1990
1990 disestablishments in Arizona
Sports in Maricopa County, Arizona